Thetidio is a small village located in Thessaly, central Greece. It is named after Thetis, the mother of Achilles.

References 

Villages in Greece
Populated places in Thessaly